James W. Swihart (born July 25, 1946) is an American diplomat who served as ambassador to Lithuania between August 26, 1994, and July 16, 1997.

Diplomatic Career
Swihart served as deputy chief of mission to Austria before being nominated as ambassador to Lithuania by President Bill Clinton. Swihart served as the United States ambassador to Lithuania between August 26, 1994, and July 16, 1997.

References

1946 births
Living people
Ambassadors of the United States to Lithuania
Place of birth missing (living people)